Frank Appel has been CEO of Deutsche Post since 18 February 2008. His present appointment is through October 2022. He has been Member of the Board of Management of Deutsche Post AG since 1 November 2002.

Career
Appel served as Chairman of the supervisory board of Deutsche Postbank AG, but effective 31 December 2010, he resigned his position on the supervisory board.

In his capacity as CEO, Appel has accompanied Chancellor Angela Merkel on various state visits abroad, including to China in 2012 and in 2014.

At the shareholders' meeting on April 7, 2022, Appel was elected to the Supervisory Board of Deutsche Telekom AG until 2026. 
On the same day, he was elected by the Supervisory Board to succeed Ulrich Lehner as its Chairman.

Other activities

Government agencies
 Economic Development Board (EDB), Member of the International Advisory Council

Corporate boards
 DHL Global Forwarding, Chairman of the Supervisory Board
 Adidas, Member of the supervisory board (2018-2019)
 Deutsche Postbank, Chairman of the Supervisory board (2008-2011)
 Deutsche Telekom AG, Member and Chairman of the Supervisory Board (since 2022)

Non-profit organizations
 Baden-Badener Unternehmer-Gespräche (BBUG), Member of the Board of Trustees
 econsense, Member of the Board of Trustees
 Federation of German Industries (BDI), Member of the Presidium
 Max Planck Society, Member of the Senate
 Working Group of Protestant Businesses (AEU), Member of the Board of Trustees

Personal life
Appel was born in 1961, is married and is the father of two children.
He spent his childhood growing up in Hamburg.

Education
 1989 - MSc in chemistry, University of Munich, Munich, Germany.
 1993 - PhD in neurobiology at Swiss Federal Institute of Technology (ETH), Zurich, Switzerland.

References

German chief executives
Ludwig Maximilian University of Munich alumni
Deutsche Post
McKinsey & Company people
Living people
Year of birth missing (living people)
People from Bergedorf